Maryla Wolska (13 March 1873 – 25 June 1930) was a Polish poet of the Young Poland movement. Her pen name was Iwo Płomieńczyk.

Bibliography 
 Thème Varié, Lwów 1902
 Symfonia Jesienna, Lwów 1902
 Święto Słońca, Lwów 1903
 Z Ogni Kupalnych, Skole 1903
 Swanta , Lwów 1909
 Dziewczęta Lwów 1910
 Arthur i Wanda, Medyka 1928, which concerns Artur Grottger and his fiancée Wanda Monné
 Dzbanek malin, Medyka 1929,

References

External links 
 Polish language article Lwowskie Zaświecie

1873 births
1930 deaths
Writers from Lviv
Polish women poets
Burials at Lychakiv Cemetery
20th-century Polish poets
20th-century Polish women writers
20th-century pseudonymous writers
Pseudonymous women writers